Tibor Nyilas (June 3, 1914 – May 19, 1986) was an American fencer. He won a bronze medal in the team sabre event at the 1948 Summer Olympics.

See also
List of USFA Division I National Champions

References

External links
 

1914 births
1986 deaths
American male sabre fencers
Fencers at the 1948 Summer Olympics
Fencers at the 1952 Summer Olympics
Fencers at the 1956 Summer Olympics
Fencers at the 1960 Summer Olympics
Olympic bronze medalists for the United States in fencing
Sportspeople from Budapest
Hungarian emigrants to the United States
Medalists at the 1948 Summer Olympics
Pan American Games medalists in fencing
Pan American Games gold medalists for the United States
Fencers at the 1951 Pan American Games
Medalists at the 1951 Pan American Games